The 1991 Purdue Boilermakers football team represented Purdue University as a member of the Big Ten Conference during the 1991 NCAA Division I-A football season. Led by first-year head coach Jim Colletto, the Boilermakers compiled an overall record of 4–7 with a mark of 3–5 in conference play, tying for sixth place the Big Ten. Purdue suffered its seventh consecutive losing season. The team played home games at Ross–Ade Stadium in West Lafayette, Indiana.

Schedule

Personnel

Game summaries

Eastern Michigan

Most points scored by Purdue since 1987 vs. Wisconsin
Most rushing yards in a game since 1983 vs. Indiana
Jim Colletto first Purdue coach to win first game since Alex Agase (1973)

at California

Notre Dame

at Northwestern

at Minnesota
 Jeff Hill 12 rushes, 110 yards

Wisconsin

Iowa

at Michigan

Illinois
 Corey Rogers 20 rushes, 146 yards

Michigan State

Indiana
 Jeff Hill 16 rushes, 116 yards

References

Purdue
Purdue Boilermakers football seasons
Purdue Boilermakers football